Time Is Running Out may refer to:

Time Is Running Out (film), a 1970 documentary
Time Is Running Out (album), by Brass Fever
"Time Is Running Out" (Muse song)
"Time Is Running Out" (Papa Roach song)
"Time Is Running Out", a song and single by Steve Winwood from his 1977 self-titled album

See also
Running Out of Time (disambiguation)